Kirill Pavlovich Suslov (born 26 October 1991) is a Russian football defender. He plays for FC Fakel Voronezh.

Club career
He made his debut in the Russian Second Division for FC Dynamo Barnaul on 23 April 2011 in a game against FC Sakhalin Yuzhno-Sakhalinsk.

He made his Russian Football National League debut for PFC Spartak Nalchik on 29 April 2013 in a game against FC Tom Tomsk.

On 8 February 2018, Suslov signed a 3-year contract with FC Amkar Perm. He made his only competitive appearance for Amkar on 20 May 2018 in a relegation playoff game against FC Tambov. That was Amkar's last game as they went bankrupt shortly after.

Suslov made his Russian Premier League debut for FC Fakel Voronezh on 17 July 2022 against FC Krasnodar.

Career statistics

Notes

References

External links

1991 births
People from Klinsky District
Sportspeople from Moscow Oblast
Living people
Russian footballers
Association football defenders
PFC CSKA Moscow players
FC Dynamo Barnaul players
PFC Spartak Nalchik players
FC Sokol Saratov players
FC KAMAZ Naberezhnye Chelny players
Kongsvinger IL Toppfotball players
FC Amkar Perm players
FC Luch Vladivostok players
FC SKA-Khabarovsk players
FC Fakel Voronezh players
Russian Premier League players
Russian First League players
Russian Second League players
Norwegian First Division players
Russian expatriate footballers
Expatriate footballers in Norway
Russian expatriate sportspeople in Norway